Al Hamra is a 400-year-old town in the region Ad Dakhiliyah, in northeastern Oman. As a province (wilayat), it is home to a number of villages including the mountainside village of Misfat Al Abryeen, with the village of Ghul to the northwest of the town, and Bimah to the north-northeast. The town and province lie on the southern slopes of the Akhdar Mountains.

Al Hamra is also known as Hamra Al Abryeen with reference to the Al Abri tribe who live there. Near the center of the town is a plaza and the souq. Some of the oldest preserved houses in Oman can be found in Al Hamra, a town built on a tilted rock slab. Many of the houses have two, three and even four stories, with ceilings made of palm beams and fronds topped by mud and straw. Visitors to the nearby souq can watch a halwa maker at work in the only halwa shop still operating in the old souq.

Mount Shams (the sun mountain), the highest mountain in Oman, sits northeast of the town of Al Hamra. Al Hoota Cave is located at the foot of Mount Shams. It is one of the largest cave systems in the world.

History
During the rule of Imam Saif bin Sultan, the fourth ruler of the Yaruba dynasty, Al Hamra was settled in the late 17th century by the Al Abri tribes. Notable for a number of Yemeni-style mud brick buildings, many of its houses have been abandoned due to its inhabitants moving into modern buildings.

Climate

References

External links

 Al Hamra Oman and its region article
 Al Hoota Cave

Populated places in Oman
Ad Dakhiliyah Governorate